Antti Rantakangas (February 28, 1964, Pulkkila - November 22, 2019) was a Finnish politician. He was elected to the Parliament of Finland in 1999 and died in office on 22 November 2019, aged 55.

References

1964 births
2019 deaths
People from Siikalatva
Centre Party (Finland) politicians
Members of the Parliament of Finland (1999–2003)
Members of the Parliament of Finland (2003–07)
Members of the Parliament of Finland (2007–11)
Members of the Parliament of Finland (2011–15)
Members of the Parliament of Finland (2015–19)
Members of the Parliament of Finland (2019–23)